Laufen Castle may refer to:

 Laufen Castle (Germany), a castle in the German state of Bavaria, notable as the site of the Oflag VII-C prisoner of war camp
 Laufen Castle (Switzerland), a castle in the Swiss canton of Zurich overlooking the Rheinfalle falls on the River Rhine